Turkestan Province was a province in Afghanistan.

It was located in northern Afghanistan in the region still known as Afghan Turkestan. In 1890, Qataghan-Badakhshan Province was separated from Turkestan Province. It is present in an administrative map of 1929, but was abolished by the time of the 1946 population census.

Political administration
In the 19th century, Afghan Turkestan was governed by a governor (hakim) appointed by the Amir. Below is a list of governors of Afghan Turkestan.

Sardar Mohammad Akram Khan - 1850 - 1852
Sardar Mohammad Afzal Khan - 1852 - 1864
Sardar Fath Mohammad Khan - 1864 - 1865
Fayz Mohammad Khan - 1865 - 1867
Naib Muhammad Alam Khan - 1868 - 1876
Shahghasi Sherdil Loynab Khan - 1876 -1878

Subdivisions 
In 1886 the administrative divisions of Afghan Turkestan were as follows:

 Mazar-i Sharif (with the districts of Shor Tapa, Boinkara, Kishindi, Aq Kupruk, Tunj
 Balkh (directly administered by the Sardar of Turkistan)
 Aqcha (with the districts of Khwaja Salar and Dawlatabad)
 Tashkorgan (with the districts of Pir Nakchir and Ghaznigak)
 Sheberghan
 Andkhui
 Aybak
 Dara-i Suf
 Doab
 Saighan and Kahmard
 Balkh-ab (high up the Band-i Amir river)
 Sangcharak
 Sar-i Pol
 Maimana

References

Former provinces of Afghanistan